Peter Kevin Shaw (born 9 January 1956) is an English former professional footballer. His clubs included Charlton Athletic, Exeter City and Gillingham, where he made over 140 Football League appearances and was named Player of the Year in 1984.

References

1956 births
Living people
English footballers
Staines Town F.C. players
Charlton Athletic F.C. players
Exeter City F.C. players
Gillingham F.C. players
Bromley F.C. players
Association football defenders